The University of Montenegro Faculty of Political Science (Montenegrin: Факултет политичких наука Универзитета Црне Горе/Fakultet političkih nauka Univerziteta Crne Gore) is one of the educational institutions of the University of Montenegro. The building is located in Podgorica and is shared with the university's faculty of law. The faculty is Montenegro's leading educational institution in political science.

History 

The Department for Political Science was opened in 2003, as a part of the faculty of law. The department had 4 sectors: Diplomacy and International Relations, Social work, Journalism and the Politological-Administrative sector. 

On May 3, 2006, the department was officially transformed into the Faculty of Political Science, comprising the following courses of studies:
 International Relations
 Journalism
 Social Policy and Social Work
 Politicology
 European Studies
In September 2006, a new course of studies was added – European Studies.

Since 2007, the whole studying process at the faculty is fully compatible with the Bologna declaration.

Organization 

The Faculty of Political Sciences administrative chain of command consists of the dean, the vice-dean and the Faculty Council. The current dean of the faculty is Sonja Tomović-Šundić, while Nataša Ružić, assistant professor, is a vice-dean for teaching process, Olivera Komar, assistant professor, is a vice-dean for international cooperation and Boris Vukićević, assistant professor, is a vice-dean for development. The Faculty Council's members are the professors, the assistants' representatives and the representative of the students.

Academic staff 

The Faculty of Political Sciences has among its academic staff some of the most eminent experts in the field of political sciences, as well as in a range of others (economy, sociology, philosophy, law, history, etc.) Amongst them, there are many widely recognized within the domestic and international academic community, as well as former or current high government officials. Some of the current members of the academic staff are:
 prof. Šerbo Rastoder, PhD – a prominent Montenegrin historian
 prof. Srđan Darmanović, PhD – current Ambassador of Montenegro to the United States of America
 prof. Gordana Đurović, PhD – former Minister of European Integrations of Montenegro
 prof. Ilija Vujačić, PhD – current dean of the University of Belgrade Faculty of Political Sciences
 prof. Čedomir Čupić, PhD – former chairman of the board of The Anti-Corruption Agency of the Republic of Serbia

Political Sciences
Political science education
Montenegro
Political Sciences
2006 establishments in Montenegro
Political science in Montenegro